This is a list of films shot in Romania.

References 

Films shot in Romania